The Los Angeles Skyhawks was a professional soccer club based in Los Angeles, California, that was a member of the American Soccer League. Founded as part of the American Soccer League's expansion to the west coast in 1976, they were the first professional sports team to be based in the San Fernando Valley area of Los Angeles. The ASL, under commissioner Bob Cousy, had expanded in an attempt to compete with the North American Soccer League. Coming into the league with the Skyhawks were the Oakland (later Golden Bay) Buccaneers, Tacoma Tides, Sacramento Spirits, and the Utah Pioneers (later Golden Spikers). These teams formed the Western Division, while the Eastern Division had the established teams New York Apollo, Connecticut Yankees, Rhode Island Oceaneers, Chicago Cats, New Jersey Americans, and Cleveland Cobras.

The Skyhawks played their games at Birmingham High School Stadium for the 1976 and 1977 seasons. At the time, Birmingham was the largest stadium in the valley with a capacity of 10,000, and it was centrally located. Many of the players commented that the field conditions and lighting were better than that at many lower division European stadiums. After 1977, the Skyhawks moved to Shephard Stadium at Los Angeles Pierce Community College.

History

1976: The magical first season
The Skyhawks managed to obtain the services of the renowned Ron Newman as their head coach, and he assembled a roster consisting of a number of young players from England's second and third divisions. Many of these players also had some limited first division experience; players such as goalkeeper Brian Parkinson (Everton), Midfielder Tony "Wheels" Whelan (Manchester City), Jimmy Rolland (Northwich Victoria), and forward Jimmy "the Price" Hinch (York), were the stars of the team. In addition, U.S. college player of the year Steve Ralbovsky (Brown University) spurned the N.A.S.L. and signed with the Skyhawks. The defense was anchored by 38-year-old sweeper and former Scottish International Ron Yeats ("the Colussus"), a veteran of the English First Division, where he was Liverpool's captain when Liverpool rose to glory in the 1960s. Hinch ended up as the A.S.L.'s leading scorer and Parkinson had the lowest goals against average (0.78) among A.S.L. goalkeepers. Led by these stars and a strong supporting cast, the Skyhawks had the league's best record (13 wins, 6 draws, 2 defeats) and regularly drew upwards of 4,000 fans per game, easily leading the ASL in attendance.

The 1976 ASL playoff format had the top 3 teams in each division qualifying for the playoffs, with the 1st place teams earning a first round bye while the 2nd place team hosted the 3rd place team.

After earning a first round bye, the Skyhawks faced the 2nd place Tacoma Tides, who had defeated Utah 2–1 in the first round. The Skyhawks took a 1–0 lead, but midway through the second half, goalkeeper Brian Parkinson suffered a head injury in a collision, and Tacoma equalized against backup keeper Marine Cano to force overtime. Facing the prospect of going into a penalty kick shootout without their #1 keeper, the Skyhawks won the game in the second 10-minute overtime period on a goal by Jimmy Rolland.

In the ASL championship game, the Skyhawks faced Eastern Division winner and defending champion New York Apollo. Over 9,000 fans showed up at Birmingham Stadium and saw the Skyhawks fall behind early, 1–0. Then late in the first half, Skyhawk defender Alty McKenzie was controversially sent off with a red card so L.A. had to play a man down the remainder of the game. But Hinch equalized early in the second half, and late in the game Ralbovsky was tripped from behind in the penalty area while on a breakaway. Skyhawk forward Ane Mihailovich buried the penalty kick into the back of the net past N.Y. keeper Gerard Joseph,  and the Skyhawks were ASL champs, making Ron Newman the only man to coach an ASL and NASL champion. Hinch was named MVP, and Newman was coach of the year.

Roster

1977 season
The Skyhawks were again led offensively by Jimmy Hinch and Jimmy Rolland (who finished 2nd and 3rd in the league in scoring) and in goal by Brian Parkinson (who finished 2nd in GAA). While they couldn't duplicate their dominance of the 1976 season, they finished 2nd in the West and 4th overall with 13 wins, 4 draws, and 7 defeats. After a 3-2 first round playoff win over the California Sunshine, they lost to Western Division champion Sacramento in the Western Division playoff finals, 2–1.

Roster

1978 season
By 1978, the ASL was in severe financial difficulty, with every team losing money. On the field, the Skyhawks, led by ASL leading scorer and MVP Jimmy Rolland and goalkeeper Brian Parkinson (again 2nd in GAA), returned to the top of the Western Division and with a record of 17-6-1. They made it to the championship game for the 2nd time in 3 years, but lost in the final, 1–0 to the New York Apollo, who had the league's best record at 18-5-1.

Roster

1979 season
The Skyhawks lost much of their scoring punch with the departures of Jimmy Hinch and Jim Rolland. Despite it all, the Skyhawks managed to place 3rd in the West with a 13-11-4 record. But the season ended with a first round playoff loss to Sacramento by a score of 3–2, in what proved to be the final Skyhawk game ever. The Skyhawks also played a friendly that season in Los Angeles Jackie Robinson Stadium against the 1980 US Men's Olympic Team in March losing the match 2–1. Due to financial difficulties, the team folded at the end of the 1979 season.

Roster

Honours
Champions
 1976

MVP
 1976: Jimmy Hinch
 1978: Jimmy Rolland

Leading Scorer
 1976: Jimmy Hinch
 1978: Jimmy Rolland

Leading Goalkeeper
 1976: Brian Parkinson

Coach of the Year  
 1976: Ron Newman

First Team All Star
 1977: Jimmy Hinch

Year-by-year

Management
 Jack Young, General Manager & Owner (1976-1977)
 Robert Nordskog, Owner (1978-1979)

Coaches
1976  Ron Newman (Head coach)
1978  Max Wosniak (Head coach) 
1978  Doug McMillan (Head coach)
1979  Geoff Davies (Head coach)

Skyhawk Trivia and Notes
Colors: Black and Gold. The home uniforms featured gold jerseys with black shorts and gold socks, while the away uniforms were black jersey with black shorts and black socks.
First game: April 17, 1976  at Birmingham Stadium. Score: Sacramento 0  Skyhawks 0  Attendance: 4,108
First goal: April 24, 1976, scored by Leif Werneid in a 1–1 tie vs. Oakland in the second game of the season.
Ron Newman is the only man to coach an NASL champion (Dallas Tornado), ASL champion (L.A. Skyhawks) and MISL champion (San Diego Sockers). He also coached the Kansas City Wizards to a division title in the MLS.
 Skyhawk alum Marine Cano currently runs "Mr. Soccer" Soccer camps in southern California. In addition, he has been a highly successful college women's soccer coach at Cal State Dominguez Hills and UC Irvine.
 The Skyhawks played a friendly in March 1979 against the 1980 US Olympic team at Jackie Robinson stadium losing the match 2–1. Jimmy Rolland scored the only goal for the Skyhawks before his departure to the California Sunshine.

References

 
Defunct soccer clubs in California
American Soccer League (1933–1983) teams
1976 establishments in California
1979 disestablishments in California
Soccer clubs in California
Association football clubs established in 1976
Association football clubs disestablished in 1979